Lammertink is a surname. Notable people with the surname include:

Jos Lammertink (born 1958), Dutch cyclist
Maurits Lammertink (born 1990), Dutch cyclist
Steven Lammertink (born 1993), Dutch cyclist, brother of Maurits

Dutch-language surnames